Jens Johan Vangensten (6 September 1766 - 8 February 1837) was a Norwegian farmer and politician.

He was born at Fet in Akershus, Norway. He operated a farm in Sørum and died in Christiania (now Oslo).

Vangensten was elected to the Norwegian Parliament in 1815, representing the constituency of Akershus Amt. He served only one term.

References

1766 births
1837 deaths
Members of the Storting
Akershus politicians
Norwegian farmers
People from Fet